Chu Văn An High School may refer to:
 Chu Văn An High School (Hanoi)
 Chu Văn An High School (Ho Chi Minh City)